Wootters is a surname. Notable people with the surname include:

 Mary Wootters, American coding theorist and computer scientist
 William Wootters (born 1951), American quantum information theorist